Whitchurch railway station serves the town of Whitchurch in Hampshire, England. The station is served and operated by South Western Railway.

Services and facilities

A ticket office is open during the morning peak.

Off peak services:
West of England Main Line
1 train per hour to London Waterloo (stopping) - South Western Railway
1 train per hour to Salisbury (stopping) - South Western Railway

Sunday trains call every two hours each way.

References

Railway stations in Hampshire
Railway stations in Great Britain opened in 1854
Former London and South Western Railway stations
Railway stations served by South Western Railway
Whitchurch, Hampshire
DfT Category E stations